Jean-Jules Clamageran (29 March 1827 – 4 June 1903) was a French politician of the French Third Republic. He was briefly minister of finance (6–16 April 1885) in the ministry of Henri Brisson. He was made a life senator in the Senate of France in 1882.

Decorations
 Chevalier de la Légion d'honneur

References

Sources

Bibliography 
 André Encrevé, « Jean-Jules Clamageran », in Patrick Cabanel et André Encrevé (dir.), Dictionnaire biographique des protestants français de 1787 à nos jours, tome 1 : A-C, Les Éditions de Paris Max Chaleil, Paris, 2015, pp. 686–687, .

External links 

 Sa fiche sur le site du Sénat

1827 births
1903 deaths
French Ministers of Finance
People of the French Third Republic
French life senators